Bellefonte Academy was a historic school building located at Bellefonte, Centre County, Pennsylvania.  The original building was built in 1805, as a two-story, rectangular limestone building.  It was enlarged between 1839 and 1845, with the addition of two bays and wings to the north and south.  After a fire in 1904, the building was rebuilt with the addition of a third story and the addition of a portico with six Tuscan order columns and Classical Revival style details.  The wings were enlarged in 1913. Also on the property was the headmaster's house.

It was added to the National Register of Historic Places in 1976.  It was delisted in 2008, after it was destroyed by fire on July 14, 2004.  It was also included in the Bellefonte Historic District.

Notable alumni
Edward Goodrich Acheson (1856–1931), chemist
Clifford Carlson (1894–1964), college basketball coach
Lionel Conacher (1900–1954), Canadian athlete and politician
Andrew Gregg Curtin (1817–1894), governor of Pennsylvania
Luby DiMeolo (1903–1966), professional football player and coach
J. Wesley Gephart (1853–1905), attorney and business executive
Frank Hood (1908–1955), professional football player
George K. James (1905–1994), college football and baseball coach
Mose Kelsch (1897–1935), professional football player
Martin Kottler (1910–1989), professional football player
James H. Osmer (1832–1912), U.S. Congressman from Pennsylvania
Franklin Guest Smith (1840–1912), U.S. Army brigadier general
Gerald Snyder (1905–1983), professional football player
Jake Stahl (1891–1966), professional football player and college football coach
John Hubler Stover (1833–1889), U.S. Congressman from Missouri
Harp Vaughan (1903–1978), professional football player
Robert J. Walker (1801–1869), U.S. Senator from Mississippi, territorial governor of Kansas, U.S. Secretary of the Treasury
John Montgomery Ward (1860–1925), professional baseball player

References

External links
Bellefonte Academy history
Fred D. Smith Collection of Photos and Postcards of the Bellefonte Academy Virtual Walking Tour Stop 31: Virtual Walking Tour of Bellefonte, Pennsylvania, Bellefonte Historical and Cultural Association website

Defunct schools in Pennsylvania
School buildings on the National Register of Historic Places in Pennsylvania
Neoclassical architecture in Pennsylvania
School buildings completed in 1805
Buildings and structures in Centre County, Pennsylvania
1805 establishments in Pennsylvania
National Register of Historic Places in Centre County, Pennsylvania
Individually listed contributing properties to historic districts on the National Register in Pennsylvania
Former National Register of Historic Places in Pennsylvania